Crassitoniella is a genus of taxonomic family of minute sea snails, marine gastropod molluscs in the family Eatoniellidae. All currently identified species in the family are endemic to the waters of Australia and New Zealand. The type specimen of the genus is Crassitoniella carinata.

Species
Species within the genus Crassitoniella include:

 Crassitoniella carinata 
 Crassitoniella erratica 
 Crassitoniella flammea 
 Crassitoniella thola

References

Eatoniellidae
Gastropod genera
Gastropods described in 1965
Gastropods of Australia
Gastropods of New Zealand
Molluscs of the Pacific Ocean
Taxa named by Winston Ponder